Mudinepalli is a village in the Krishna district of the Indian state of Andhra Pradesh. Mudinepalli hosts nearly all species of Indian snakes, which can survive in this southern region of India.

Demographics
The population consists of  males,  females and  children aged 0–6 years. The average literacy rate stands at 77.85% with  literates, significantly higher than the national average of 73%.

Etymology 
Mudinepalli was formerly known as Mudi Naagula Palli. The village derives its name from the Sanskrit words mudi which means 'old', nāgá which means 'snake' (or 'cobra'), and palli which means 'village'. The name also relates to Nāgá Devatha, a Hindu deity.

See also 
Villages in Mudinepalli mandal

References 

Villages in Krishna district
Mandal headquarters in Krishna district